Şefik Avni Özdoğru (1884 in Samsun – July 3, 1960 in Samsun) was an officer of the Ottoman Army and of the Turkish Army. Mayor of Samsun (March – June 1925). He was a younger brother of Talat Avni (Özüdoğru).

Works
Keşif
Ağır Topçuların Eğitimi

Medals and decorations
Order of the Medjidie 4th class
Prussia Iron Cross
Austria-Hungary Military Merit Medal (Austria-Hungary)
Austria-Hungary Order of the Iron Crown (Austria)
Medal of Independence with Red Ribbon

See also
List of high-ranking commanders of the Turkish War of Independence

Sources

1884 births
1960 deaths
People from Samsun
Ottoman Imperial School of Military Engineering alumni
Ottoman Military College alumni
Ottoman Army officers
Ottoman military personnel of the Italo-Turkish War
Ottoman military personnel of the Balkan Wars
Ottoman military personnel of World War I
Ottoman prisoners of war
World War I prisoners of war held by the United Kingdom
Turkish Army officers
Turkish military personnel of the Greco-Turkish War (1919–1922)
Recipients of the Order of the Medjidie, 4th class
Recipients of the Iron Cross (1914)
Recipients of the Medal of Independence with Red Ribbon (Turkey)
Mayors of places in Turkey
Liberal Republican Party (Turkey) politicians
Democrat Party (Turkey, 1946–1961) politicians
20th-century Turkish politicians